UAMS may refer to:

 University of Arkansas for Medical Sciences in Little Rock, Arkansas, United States
 Universiteit Antwerpen Management School in Antwerp, Belgium